Susan Tsu is an American costume designer who, as of 2017, was the Bessie F. Anathan Professor at Carnegie Mellon University and is featured in Who’s Who in Fine Arts Higher Education and Who’s Who of American Women.

References

Year of birth missing (living people)
Living people
Carnegie Mellon University faculty
American costume designers
Carnegie Mellon University alumni
 Ojibwe people